The 1997 Scott Tournament of Hearts Canadian women's national curling championship, was played February 22 to March 2 at the PNE Agrodome in Vancouver, British Columbia. It would be the last Scott tournament that Sandra Schmirler would win before her death in 2000.

Teams

Standings

Results

Draw 1

Draw 2

Draw 3

Draw 4

Draw 5

Draw 6

Draw 7

Draw 8

Draw 9

Draw 10

Draw 11

Draw 12

Draw 13

Draw 14

Draw 15

Draw 16

Draw 17

Page playoffs

1 vs. 2

3 vs. 4

Semi-final

Final

References

Scotties Tournament of Hearts
Scott Tournament of Hearts
Scott Tournament Of Hearts, 1997
Sport in Vancouver
Curling in British Columbia
1997 in women's curling
February 1997 sports events in Canada
March 1997 sports events in Canada